Sandow "Sandy" Sacks Ruby (July 23, 1941 – November 22, 2008) was an American mathematician and entrepreneur who helped found the electronics retail company Tech HiFi.

Biography 
He was born on July 23, 1941 in Orange, New Jersey, to Myron Ruby and Leonore Sacks. The earliest years of his life were spent on army bases as his father served as an officer in the United States Army during World War II but the rest of his childhood was mostly spent in Essex Fells and South Orange. After graduation from Phillips Academy in Andover, Massachusetts he was accepted into Harvard where he studied mathematics, he later attended M.I.T.

While at M.I.T. he and a fellow student by the name of John Strohbeen started selling stereos out of their dorm room, a business which would grow into Tech HiFi, one of the largest consumer electronics chains in the country. Ruby and Strohbeen opened their first store at the corner of Massachusetts Avenue and Vassar street in Cambridge. The business had expanded to more than eighty stores by the time they went out of business during the mid eighties.

He died on November 22, 2008 in Boston at the age of 67 from diabetes-related complications.

References 

20th-century American mathematicians
1941 births
2008 deaths
Harvard University alumni
Massachusetts Institute of Technology alumni
Deaths from diabetes